Stefan Moses (29 August 1928 – 3 February 2018)  was a German photographer living in Munich.

Life 
Born in Legnica, Province of Lower Silesia, Moses was forced to leave school in 1943 because of his Jewish heritage and survived a forced labour camp. After training as a photographer in Wrocław shortly after the end of World War II, he worked as a theatre photographer at the Deutsches Nationaltheater und Staatskapelle Weimar. From 1950, he lived in Munich, where he first became known for his reportages for the Stern. His documentary portraits of people and professions in West Germany (Germans) and later in East Germany (Farewell and Beginnings) made him accessible to a large audience. Moses took people out of their working environment and photographed them in front of a grey linen cloth - thus creating contemporary documents. Stefan Moses also created portraits of numerous personalities such as Thomas Mann, Ilse Aichinger, Erich Kästner, Peggy Guggenheim, Theodor W. Adorno, Otto Dix, Max Frisch or Martin Mayer. An exhibition of his life's work has been on display in various European cities since 2003. These were taken between 1947 and 2003. Stefan Moses was married to the artist .

Awards 
 1990: David Octavius Hill Medal
 1991: Kultureller Ehrenpreis der Landeshauptstadt München.
 Ab 1994: Mitglied der Bayerischen Akademie der Schönen Künste in München.
 Ab 1994: Mitglied der Bayerische Akademie der Schönen Künste in München.
 2001: Ehrenpreis der 
 2004: Order of Merit of the Federal Republic of Germany (I. Classe)
 2014: Lovis Corinth Prize

Publications 
 Manuel. Wegner, Hamburg 1967.
 Transsibirische Eisenbahn. Prestel, München 1979.
 Deutsche. Portraits der Sechziger Jahre. Prestel, München 1980.
 Abschied und Anfang – Ostdeutsche Porträts. Hatje Cantz, Ostfildern 1991.
 Das Tier und sein Mensch. Sanssouci Verlag, München 1997.
 Jeder Mensch ist eine kleine Gesellschaft. Prestel, München 1998.
 DDR – Ende mit Wende: 200 Photographien 1989–1990. Hatje Cantz, Ostfildern 1999, .
 Stefan Moses. Schirmer/Mosel, 2002.
 Ilse Aichinger. Ein Bilderbuch von Stefan Moses. S. Fischer, Frankfurt am Main 2006.
 Die sich die Freiheit nahmen. Photographs by Wilfried Bauer, Robert Lebeck, Stefan Moses, Christian G. Irrgang. Damm und Lindlar Verlag, 2008. (Portraits of Ilse Aichinger, Sarah Kirsch and Rose Ausländer.)
 Deutschlands Emigranten. 2013. Text: Christoph Stölzl. Nimbus Verlag, Wädenswil 2013, .
 Begegnungen mit Peggy Guggenheim. Elisabeth Sandmann Verlag, 2017, . (Vergl.: Peggy Guggenheim.)

Solo exhibitions 
 1980: Museum Folkwang.
 2003–2005: Retrospektive.
 2007: Ilse Aichinger – Fotografien von Stefan Moses. 
 2008: Stefan Moses – Münchner Leben. Münchner Stadtmuseum
 2012: Stefan Moses – Emigranten. Johanna Breede, Berlin January 
 2013: Stefan Moses – Deutschlands Emigranten. Bayerische Akademie der Schönen Künste, Munich
 2015: Stefan Moses. Lovis Corinth Prize 2014. Bayerische Akademie der Schönen Künste, Regensburg
 2016: Stefan Moses – Ein Welttheater. Johanna Breede, Berlin
 2017: Stefan Moses – Blumenkinder. Literaturhaus München
 2018: Stefan Moses – Künstler. Johanna Breede Photokunst, Berlin
 2019: Das exotische Land Deutsches Historisches Museum
 2020: das Tier und sein Mensch. Johanna Breede Photokunst, Berlin

Group exhibitions 
 2011: Portraits in Serie. Museum für Kunst und Gewerbe Hamburg
 2013: Kleiden – Verkleiden. Museum Folkwang
 2014: Barbara Klemm/Stefan Moses. Museum Küppersmühle für Moderne Kunst, Duisburg
 2016: Aufbrüche – Bilder aus Deutschland. , Berlin
 2017: /Stefan Moses. 
 2017: Blicke, die bleiben. Fotografische Porträts aus der Sammlung Fricke. Suermondt-Ludwig-Museum, Aachen

Further reading 
 Eva-Monika Turck: Stefan Moses – Gestische Topographie Ostdeutschlands. Herbert Utz Verlag, München 2003,

References

External links 
 
 Ausstellung in der Bayrischen Akademie der Schönen Künste (PDF-file; 187-kB)

German photographers
Theatrical photographers
German photojournalists
Portrait photographers
Officers Crosses of the Order of Merit of the Federal Republic of Germany
1928 births
2018 deaths
People from Silesia